Helen Smith Woodruff (June 7, 1888 – 1924)  was an American author, playwright, and philanthropist. She wrote books for young adults and children. She set most of the stories in her native South and donated the proceeds from some of her books, including one about a blind boy, to charities.

Life and career
Helen Smith was born on June 7, 1888 in Selma, Alabama to parents Emma West Smith and Oscar Emmet Smith. She went to school in Anniston, Alabama, and attended a New York finishing school for two years. In 1903, she met Lewis B. Woodruff, and a year later they were married. After her marriage, she moved to New York City, where her husband was from.

In 1918, she wrote the musical comedy play, Hooray for the Girls while living in Ash Grove, her summer home in Litchfield, Connecticut.

She co-wrote the 1922 musical, Just Because. According to Cait Miller at the Library of Congress, the play "may well have been the first full-length Broadway musical authored entirely by women".

Woodruff died in 1924.

References

External links

Newspaper article about buying rights to Just Because
Review of Lady of the Lighthouse

1888 births
1924 deaths
20th-century American women writers
20th-century American dramatists and playwrights
Writers from Alabama
People from Selma, Alabama
American women dramatists and playwrights
Philanthropists from Alabama
American women philanthropists
Writers from New York City
20th-century American philanthropists
20th-century women philanthropists